Somatina sanctithomae is a moth of the  family Geometridae. It is found on São Tomé.

References

Moths described in 1958
Scopulini